Erik Thorsteinsen Toft (born 14 November 1992) is a Norwegian handball player, who plays for KIF Kolding and the Norwegian national team.

He represented Norway at the 2022 European Men's Handball Championship.

References

1992 births
Living people
Norwegian male handball players
People from Elverum
Sportspeople from Innlandet